This page is an overview of the Netherlands at the UCI Track Cycling World Championships.

List of medalists 

This a list of Dutch medals won at the UCI Track World Championships. This list does not (yet) include the amateur disciplines and defunct disciplines.

Sources

Medal table

Medals by discipline
updated after the 2014 UCI Track Cycling World Championships

Medals by championships
incomplete, you can help by adding the Dutch results at championships before 2001

Broken records at World Championships
incomplete, only women's 3000 m team pursuit records listed

Women's 3000 m team pursuit

After the introduction of the women's 3000m team pursuit at the 2007–08 track cycling season, the Dutch team broke three time the Dutch record at the World Championships. The latest one is not the current record anymore.

1981 
The Netherlands competed at the 1981 UCI Track Cycling World Championships in Brno, Czechoslovakia in 1981. The event consisted of 14 disciplines for professional and amateur men and women. The Netherlands sent a team of 4 women, 13 amateur men and 7 professional men cyclists. With 2 gold and one bronze medal, the Netherlands finished third in the medal table.

The next riders were selected by the KNWU after the Dutch national championships and were published on 10 August 1981. For the men's motor paced Martin Rietveld was replaced by Fred Rompelberg. From the five selected riders for the men's team pursuit Peter Pieters was not selected by the coach after his bad performance in the individual pursuit.

Men's amateur points race
 Peter Pieters – DNF 

Men's amateur 1 km time trial
 Rainier Valkenburg – 12th in 1:09.13 (9th?)

Men's amateur sprint
Reinier Valkenburg – 1st round won ( Isler), lost 2nd round ( Goelasjvili), lost 2nd round repaches ( Platek)
Sjaak Pieters  – 1st round lost, 1st round repaches lost
Tom Vrolijk  – 1st round lost, 1st round repaches lost

Men's Keirin
Hans Vonk – 1st round did not advance, 1st round repaches did not advance

Men's amateur team pursuit
 Qualification Ab Harren, Rik Moorman, John Roozenburg, Ab van Asten in 4:39.56 (did not qualify)

Men's amateur tandem
 Tom Vrolijk/Peter Pieters – Won 1st round (vs. Poland) (qualified for semi final) – Semi final

Men's individual pursuit
 Roy Schuiten – 2nd in 6:03.42 (qualified for semi final) – Lost semi final – Lost semi final – Lost bronze medal race (vs. Bert Oosterbosch)
 Herman Ponsteen – Qualification in 6:09.46 (did not qualify for quarter finals) 
 Bert Oosterbosch – 3rd in 6:06.87 (qualified for semi finals)  – Won semi final – Won bronze medal race (vs. Roy Schuiten)

Men's amateur individual pursuit
The Dutch men Ad van Asten and national champion Peter Pieters finished disappointingly 29th and 35th. Their times were about 5 seconds slower as during the national championships in Nijmegen.
 Ad van Asten – 29th in qualification (did not qualify for next round)
 Peter Pieters – 35th in qualification (did not qualify for next round)

Men's motor-paced
 Martin Venix – Won qualification (qualified for final)
 René Kos – Qualification (qualified for final) –  in final
 Fred Rompelberg – Qualification (did not qualify for final) -

Men's amateur motor-paced
Both Mathé Pronk and Gaby Minneboo qualified with a second place in the 1st round directly for the final, respectively behind Podlesch from East Germany and Fusarpoli from Italy. Coach Stam was not totally satisfied as Ger Slot and Eric Geserick did not qualify. Minneboo tried to help Slot, but Slot was not good enough. Also the motor of his pacer Van Duivenbode damaged during the race and leaked oil. Just after the start a foot of Geserick came out of his toeclip, and couldn't ride thereafter his qualification well. 
Gaby Minneboo – 2nd in 1st round (qualified for final) – 7th in final
Marthé Pronk – 2nd in 1st round (qualified for final) –  in final (stayer Noppie Koch)
Eric Geserick – 1st round (did not qualify) – 5th in 1st round repechages heat 1 (did not qualify)
Ger Slot –  1st round (did not qualify) – 1st in 1st round repechages heat 2 (qualified) (stayer Koch van Pronk) – Disqualified in final (stayer Van Duivenbode)

Women's sprint
Erica Oomen – Won qualification, (vs.  Hana Hotova &  Conny Paraskevin) (qualified) – Lost 2nd round (vs.  Sheila Young) (did not qualify) – Lost 2nd round repechages (vs.  Sue Novarra) (did not qualify)
Sandra de Neef – Lost qualification, (vs. ) (did not qualify for next round)

Women's individual pursuit
 Petra de Bruin – 9th in qualification (did not qualify) 
 Monique Kauffmann – Qualification 4:02.17 (qualified for quarter finals)   – Lost quarter finals from  Nedegeda Kibardina 4:07.31 vs. 3:56.71

2008 
The Netherlands competed at the 2008 UCI Track Cycling World Championships in Manchester, Great Britain, from 26 March to 30 March 2008. The event consisted of 18 different disciplines for elite men and women, the Netherlands competed in 17 of them.

Sprint

Time trial

Individual Pursuit

Team pursuit

Team sprint

Keirin

Scratch

Points race

Madison

Omnium

Source

2009
The Netherlands competed at the 2009 UCI Track Cycling World Championships in Pruszków, Poland, from 25 March to 29 March 2009. The event consisted of 19 different disciplines for elite men and women.

Sprint

Time trial

Individual Pursuit

Team pursuit

Team sprint

Keirin

Scratch

Points race

Madison

Omnium

Source

2010
The Netherlands competed at the 2010 UCI Track Cycling World Championships in Ballerup, Copenhagen, Denmark, from 24 March to 28 March 2010. The event consisted of 19 different disciplines for elite men and women, the Netherlands competed in 18 of them.

Sprint

Time trial

Individual Pursuit

Team pursuit

Team sprint

Keirin

Scratch

Points race

Madison

Omnium

Source

2011
The Netherlands competed at the 2011 UCI Track Cycling World Championships in Apeldoorn, the Netherlands, from 23 March to 27 March 2011. The event consisted of 19 different disciplines for elite men and women.

Sprint

Time trial

Individual Pursuit

Team pursuit

Team sprint

Keirin

Scratch

Points race

Madison

Omnium

Source

2015
Netherlands competed at the 2015 UCI Track Cycling World Championships in Saint-Quentin-en-Yvelines at the Vélodrome de Saint-Quentin-en-Yvelines from 18 to 22 February 2015. A team of 13 cyclists (4 women, 9 men) was announced to represent the country in the event.

Men

Sources

Women

Sources

2016 

A team of 15 cyclists (4 women, 11 men) was announced to represent the country in the event. One of the entrants is Elis Ligtlee, a favourite in several sprint disciplines, who crashed at the Six days of Rotterdam in January. She had a concussion of the brain and bruises on her legs and hip but says she is fit for the World Championships. Also Theo Bos is part of the selection. After the 2008 Summer Olympics he changed from the track to the road. Two months before the 2016 World Track Championships he announced he returned to the track and wants to prove he is good enough to be part of the Dutch team for the 2016 Summer Olympics in the team sprint.

Men

Sources

(*) Hugo Haak competed in the qualifications instead of Matthijs Büchli.
(**) Dion Beukeboom competed in the qualifications and first round instead of Joost van der Burg.

Women

Sources

References

See also

Other countries
 Australia at the UCI Track Cycling World Championships
 Cuba at the UCI Track Cycling World Championships
Netherlands at other UCI events
 Netherlands at the UCI Road World Championships
 Netherlands at the UCI Track Cycling World Cup Classics

Netherlands at cycling events
Nations at the UCI Track Cycling World Championships